Dirk Urban (born 14 January 1969 in Neumünster, Schleswig-Holstein) is a retired German shot putter. His personal best throw was 20.26 metres, achieved in July 1996 in Iffezheim.

He won the silver medal at the 1996 European Indoor Championships, and competed at the 1996 Olympic Games without reaching the final. He represented the sports club LG Wedel/Pinneberg, and won the silver medal at the German championships in 1996.

Achievements

References

1969 births
Living people
People from Neumünster
German male shot putters
Athletes (track and field) at the 1996 Summer Olympics
Olympic athletes of Germany
West German male shot putters
Sportspeople from Schleswig-Holstein